In France, the fundamental principles recognized by the laws of the Republic (French: principes fondamentaux reconnus par les lois de la République, abbreviated to PFRLR) are certain principles identified by the Constitutional Council and the Council of State as having constitutional force.

This notion is mentioned without further explanation in the preamble of the Constitution of 1946. The preamble of the constitution of 1958 references the 1946 preamble, and the constitutional judge, in their decision n°71-44 DC of 16 July 1971, which gave constitutional force to this preamble.

Initial appearance 

The principles attached to this notion were defined by the judge. First, the Council of State identified freedom of association as a fundamental principle, initially basing it on a 1956 appellate decision and then from 1971 the Constitutional Council in its Decision #71-44 DC on freedom of association as well.

Today, the fundamental principles designate in the modern spirit the landmark laws of the first, second, and third republics, notably the freedom of conscience and freedom of association.

Constitutionalization of principles 
The extensive design of the constitutional text developed by the Constitutional Council since 1971 gave constitutional force to some principles by giving them the status of one of the fundamental principles recognized by the laws of the Republic (PFRLR). These essential principles of French law, created by the legislature but not specified in the constitution or raised as a constitutional norm, such as the principle of independence of administrative jurisdiction or freedom of association, are then imposed on the legislature and administration.

PFRLR are mainly defined by the constitutional judges, even if its first mention was from the Council of State. These jurisdictions consider themselves as not the creators but as the interpreters of these principles, to avoid accusations of a “government by the judges”. The judges “discover” these principles by extracting them from French republican tradition.

Applicability criteria 
The Constitutional Council verified four criteria before recognizing the PFRLR. Thus, a principle must come from:

 A legislative text from before 1946 (instauration of the Fourth Republic), of a general scope stating the principle.
 Taken from a republican regime (excluding legislation from the monarchical regimes and from the Vichy regime), even if an exception exists from the PFRLR identified in the decision of  “Competitiveness council”, relying partly on the law of 16 and  adopted by the National Constituent Assembly and sanctioned by Louis XVI ;
 Having been applied continuously; there can be no exception allowed.
 And passed as a general (and not contingent) legal principle. This condition explains why the Jus soli is not identified as a PFRLR, since the law of 1889 giving it an absolute character (confirmed by a law of 1927) was not affirming a principle but was linked to the circumstances of the time, here the establishment of conscription (Constitutional Council, Decision n°93-321 DC of ). As such, PFRLR are not comparable to traditions, customs, or simple habits of positive law.
 The principle must have a “sufficient importance” (see Decision no. 98-407 DC of 14 January 1999, Act determining the mode of election of regional councillors, 9th “Considering that, in any event, the invoked rule does not have a sufficient importance to be regarded as a 'fundamental principle recognized by the laws of the Republic' mentioned in the first paragraph of the Preamble of the Constitution of 1946, thus the gripe must be rejected”.)

Since 2013 and the Decision no. 2013-669 DC of 17 May 2013 “Law providing for same-sex marriage”, three new conditions were identified. At this occasion, the Council ruled that the opposite-sex character of marriage was not a PFRLR.

The principles must pertain to at least one of the following topics:
 The organization of public powers ;
 National sovereignty ;
 Fundamental rights and freedoms.

List of principles 
As of April 2022, the Constitutional Council has identified eleven principles as PFRLR:

 Freedom of association
 Rights of defense in a trial
 Individual liberty
  and notably academic freedom
 Freedom of conscience
 Independence of administrative jurisdiction
 Independence of university professors and lecturers
 Exclusiveness of administrative jurisdiction for the cancelling or reform of decisions taken in the exercise of prerogatives of public powers
 Judicial authority guardian of private property
 Existence of a criminal justice for minors
 The use of local laws in Alsace and Moselle “as long as they have not been replaced with common laws or harmonized with them”

Furthermore, the Council of State in 1996 identified the prohibition of political extradition.

The PFRLR are to be distinguished from other principles identified by the Constitutional Council:

  which are general principles of French law having the effect of constitutional text
 The

See also 

 Fundamental freedoms
 Constitution of the Fifth Republic
 Judiciary of France

References 
Notes

Citations

Legal doctrines and principles
Government of France